Field hockey at the 2018 Commonwealth Games was held on the Gold Coast, Australia from 5 to 14 April. The hockey competition was held at the Gold Coast Hockey Centre. This is the sixth time that the hockey competition was held, following the sport's debut at the 1998 Games.

Competition schedule
The following is the competition schedule for the hockey competitions:

Qualification
A total of ten men's and women's team qualified to compete at the games. Each nation may enter one team in each tournament (18 athletes per team) for a maximum total of 36 athletes. The host nation (Australia) along with the top nine ranked nations in the FIH World Rankings as of 31 October 2017, qualified for the games.

Men's qualification

Women's qualification

Men's competition

The competition consisted of two stages; a group stage followed by a knockout stage.

Group stage
Teams were divided into two groups of five nations, playing every team in their group once. Three points were awarded for a victory, one for a draw. The top two teams per group qualified for the semi-finals.

Group A

Group B

Medal round

Women's competition

The competition consisted of two stages; a group stage followed by a knockout stage.

Group stage
Teams were divided into two groups of five nations, playing every team in their group once. Three points were awarded for a victory, one for a draw. The top two teams per group qualified for the semi-finals.

Group A

Group B

Medal round

Medal summary

Medal table

Medalists

Participating nations
There are 11 participating nations at the hockey competitions with a total of 360 athletes. The number of athletes a nation entered is in parentheses beside the name of the country.

References

External links
 Results Book – Hockey

 
2018
2018 Commonwealth Games events
Commonwealth Games
2018 Commonwealth Games
Commonwealth Games